Business Park Sofia (BPS) is the largest office park in Central and Eastern Europe and the first of its kind in Bulgaria.

The Project
Business Park Sofia (BPS) is owned by Arco Capital Corporation Ltd. and is the largest office park in Central and Eastern Europe. The facility accommodates some of the most successful businesses in diverse industries. The park is designed to provide efficiency, flexibility and convenience to corporate tenants of any size and scope. It is a genuine multifunctional high-tech business park, which combines essential business components and related sectors in a vibrant community. BPS consists of 14 buildings. Its plot area is 89,000 m² and the total built-up area is 210,000 m². Each day the park accommodates over 12,500 people working in it and about 2,500 visitors.

Total leasable area - 125 900 m² of which:
- Office area - 100 700 m² 
- Warehouse - 15 000 m² 
- Commercial area - 9 300 m²

Location
Business Park Sofia is located at the foot of Vitosha Mountain with easy access to all major traffic arteries and direct access to Sofia's Ring Road. The Park is less than 20 minutes away from the central city district and within 8-minute drive to Sofia Airport.
Reaching Business Park Sofia is facilitated by public transport, including dedicated subway station connecting the Park with the city. Public transport runs between the Park and strategic points throughout the city. The Business Park Sofia Metro Station connects the area of BPS to the Sofia Airport and the city center.

Gallery

References

External links

 Business Park Sofia website

Buildings and structures in Sofia
Economy of Sofia
Business parks